Inter-Switch Link can stand for:
 The link joining of two Fibre Channel switches through E_ports
 Cisco Inter-Switch Link (ISL) is a proprietary protocol that maintains VLAN information as traffic flows between switches and routers.